Madan Puri (30 September 1915 – 13 January 1985) was an Indian actor of Hindi and Punjabi films. His brothers were actors Chaman Puri and Amrish Puri. As a character actor mainly in negative roles (villain), he acted in about 430 films in a career spanning above fifty years.

Early life
Madan Lal Puri was born in Nawanshahr, Punjab, in a Punjabi Hindu family, to Nihal Chand Puri and Ved Kaur. He studied in Rahon.  He was the second of five children, with elder brother Chaman Puri, younger brothers Amrish Puri and Harish Lal Puri and younger sister Chandrakanta Mehra. He was an cousin of singing sensation Kundan Lal Sehgal.

Career
Puri was one of the doyens of the Indian film industry in the late 1960s and early 1970s. He was the first cousin of the singer K. L. Saigal, with whose help he started to make a mark in Bollywood. Once Puri was an established star he did the same for his brother, Amrish Puri, by helping him in establishing himself in the movie world.

Puri had an acting career which spanned over 40 years from the 1940s through to the mid-1980s. He appeared in more than 430 films. His film debut was titled Ahinsa in 1946. Madan made an average of eight films per year, playing villains and negative characters and the hero's or heroine's uncle, father or elder brother, grandfather, police officer and politician. He starred in a number of Punjabi films throughout his career such as Jatti, Jatt Punjabi and so on.

He died in 1985 of a heart attack at the age of 69. He was a resident of R P Masani Road in Matunga, Mumbai, also known as Punjabi Galli, with other actors of that era including the Kapoors. Several films were released after his death until 1989 with his final being Santosh.

Personal life
Puri's wife, Sheela Devi Puri (Wadhera), died a few years after him. Their son, Lt. Col. (Dr.) Kamlesh K. Puri, published a book about the life and times of Madan Puri titled "My Father, the Villain" in 2015 (the 100th anniversary of his birth).

Selected filmography

 Khazanchi (1941)
 Meri Bahen (1944)
 Ahinsa (1946)
 Sona (1948)
 Vidya (1948) as Harilal "Harry"
 Dil Ki Duniya (1949)
 Jeet (1949) as Ratan
 Namoona (1949) 
 Singaar (1949)
 Anmol Ratan (1950)
  Madari (1950) Punjabi Movie 
 Ada (1951)
 Nadaan (1951)
 Deewana (1952)
 Goonj (1952)
 Raag Rang (1952)
 Munna (1954)
 Shri Chaitanya Mahaprabhu (1954)
 Bhagwat Mahima (1955)
 Jhanak Jhanak Payal Baaje (1955)
 Aabroo (1956)
 Heer (1956)
 Baarish (1957)
 Ek Saal (1957)
 Mirza Sahiba (1957) as Shamir
 Nau Do Gyarah (1957) as Radhe Shyam
 Dilli Ka Thug (1958) as Bihari
 Howrah Bridge (1958) as John Chang
 Kabhi Andhera Kabhi Ujala (1958)
 Taqdeer (1958)
 Trolley Driver (1958)
 Insan Jaag Utha (1959) as Mohan Singh
 Kanhaiya (1959) as Mano
 Nai Raahen (1959)
 Chaudhary Karnail Singh (1960) as Boota Singh
 Jaali Note (1960)
 Kala Bazar (1960) as Ganesh
 Kiklee (1960)
 Singapore (1960) as Chang
 Guddi (1961) as Namberdaar Punjabi Movie 
 Pyaar Ka Saagar (1961)
 Tel Malish Boot Polish (1961)
 Bees Saal Baad (1962) as Dr. Pandey
 China Town (1962)
 Rakhi (1962) as Choudhary Bhagwandas
 Gehra Daag (1963)
 Godaan (1963)
 Shikari (1963)
 Sunheri Nagin (1963)
 Ek Raaz (1963) as Chunilal
 Ayee Milan Ki Bela (1964) as Ratanlal
 Cha Cha Cha (1964)
 Kashmir Ki Kali (1964) as Shyamlal
 Kohraa (1964)
 Mr. X in Bombay (1964)
 Ziddi (1964) as Moti
 Gumnaam (1965) as Dr. Acharya
 Mohabbat Isko Kahete Hain (1965)
 Neela Akash (1965) as Abdul
 Shaheed (1965) as Jailor
 Waqt (1965) as Balvir
 Love in Tokyo (1966) as Asha's Uncle
 Main Wohi Hoon (1966) as Jagdish
 Phool Aur Patthar (1966) as Boss
 Sawan Ki Ghata (1966) as Limo
 Thakur Jarnail Singh (1966)
 Aag (1967) as Kallu Singh
 Aamne Samne (1967)
 Baharon Ke Sapne (1967) as Ranjeet
 Gunehgar (1967)
 Hamraaz (1967) as Captain (Rajesh's friend)
 Johar in Bombay (1967) as Gopal
 Shagird (1967)
 Upkar (1967) as Charandas
 Aankhen (1968) as Captain
 Duniya (1968)
 Hai Mera Dil (1968)
 Humsaya (1968)
 Juaari (1968)
 Ittefaq (1969) as Public Prosecutor Khanna
 Aradhana (1969) as Prison Warden
 Aadmi Aur Insaan (1969) as Sabharwal
 Pyar Hi Pyar (1969) as Dindayal
 Oos Raat Ke Baad (1969)
 Pyar Ka Mausam (1969) as Shankar 
 Shatranj (1969) as Comrade Chang
 Talash (1969) as Peter
 The Train (1970) as Yogi / No. 1
 Aag Aur Daag (1970) as Madanlal
 Bhai Bhai (1970)
 Choron Ka Chor (1970)
 Devi (1970) as Joginder
 Kati Patang (1970) as Vishnu Prasad
 My Love (1970)
 Prem Pujari (1970) as Chang
 Purab Aur Paschim (1970) as Preeti's dad
 Yaadgaar (1970) as Madan Singh
 Amar Prem (1971)
 Caravan (1971) as Mithalal Tota
 Ek Paheli (1971) as Shankarlal
 Elaan (1971) as Mr. Verma
 Guddi (1971) as Lambhardara
 Haathi Mere Saathi (1971) as Ratanlal
 Hulchul (1971) as Mahesh Jetley
 Lakhon Mein Ek (1971) as Jaggu
 Nadaan (1971) as Mangu
 Paras (1971) as Thakur Prithvi Singh
 Rakhwala (1971)
 Sanjog (1971) as Shiv Dayal
 Ramu Ustad (1971)
 Woh Din Yaad Karo (1971)
 Apna Desh (1972) as Satyanarayan
 Apradh (1972) as German Doctor
 Dastaan (1972)
 Double Cross (1972) as Maganbhai
 Gora Aur Kala (1972) as Raja Zoravar Singh (Anuradha's Father)
 Haar Jeet (1972) as Madhusudan Gupta
 Janwar Aur Insaan (1972) as Gokulchand
 Samadhi (1972) as Jaggu
 Sazaa (1972)
 Shehzada (1972) as Chanda's maternal uncle
 Shor (1972) as Factory owner (Guest Appearance)
 Wafaa (1972) as Zamindar
 Joshila (1973) as Madanlal Dogra
 Loafer (1973) as Mr. Puri
 Dhund (1973) as Inspector Joshi
 Bada Kabutar (1973) as Ghaffoor
 Bandhe Hath (1973) as Shyamu's Mentor
 Black Mail (1973) as Dr. Khurana
 Daag: A Poem of Love (1973) as K.C. Khanna
 Dharma (1973) as Mangal Singh
 Gaddaar (1973)
 Nafrat (1973)
 Naya Nasha (1973)
 Anuraag (1973) as Amirchand
 Majboor (1974) as Mahipat Rai
 Benaam (1974) as Gopal
 Ajanabee (1974) as Mr. M.M. Puri
 Jab Andhera Hota Hai (1974)
 Chor Machaye Shor (1974) as Seth Jamunadas
 Bidaai (1974) as Dharam Das
 Manoranjan (1974) as Police Inspector
 Pran Jaye Par Vachan Na Jaye (1974) as Jagmohan
 Roti Kapda Aur Makaan (1974) as Nekiram
 Zehreela Insaan (1974)
 Dharmatma (1975)
 Zameer (1975) as Daku Maan Singh
 Dafaa 302 (1975) Indian Penal Code Section 302 (Section of Murder) as Inspector General of Police
 Deewaar (1975) as Samant 
 Geet Gaata Chal (1975) as Sohan Singh
 Ponga Pandit (1975) as Shambhunath
 Rafoo Chakkar (1975) as Prakash
 Raftaar (1975) as Jackson
 Saazish (1975)
 Warrant (1975) as Professor Ashok Verma
 Fakira (1976) as Chamanlal
 Mehbooba (1976) as Sardar
 Bhanwar (1976) as John D'Souza / Johny
 Aaj Ka Ye Ghar (1976) as Sajjan's Father-in-law
 Aap Beati (1976)
 Bairaag (1976)
 Daaj (1976)
 Kalicharan (1976) as Jaagir Singh
 Khalifa (1976)
 Aaina (1977) as M.B. Patil
 Chakkar Pe Chakkar (1977)
 Darinda (1977)
 Dulhan Wahi Jo Piya Man Bhaye (1977)
 Kasum Khoon Ki (1977)
 Paapi (1977) as Harnamdas 
 Ram Bharose (1977) as Boss
 Shirdi Ke Sai Baba (1977) as Ranvir Singh
 Vishwasghaat (1977) as Uday's dad
 Ghar (1978) as Vikas' Father
 Aahuti (1978) as Heeralal
 Ankhiyon Ke Jharokhon Se (1978) as Mr. Mathur (Arun's dad)
 Chor Ho To Aisa (1978) as Chinaramu "Ramu"
 Heeralaal Pannalaal (1978)
 Naya Daur (1978)
 Swarg Narak (1978) as Lala Lalchand
 Vishwanath (1978) as Pukhraj
 Badmashon Ka Badmaash (1979)
 Raadha Aur Seeta (1979)
 The Great Gambler (1979) as Ratan Das
 Gautam Govinda (1979) as Bagha
 Aur Kaun? (1979)
 Jaan-e-Bahaar (1979) as Ajit's maternal uncle
 Jaani Dushman (1979) as Blind Vaidji (Reshma's dad)
 Jatt Punjabi (1979)
 Muqabla (1979)
 Noorie (1979) as Lala Karamchand
 Aap To Aise Na The (1980)
 Humkadam (1980) as Hari Harprasad
 Alibaba Aur 40 Chor (1980) as Fatima's dad
 Abdullah (1980) as Military Commander
 Bandish (1980)
 The Burning Train (1980) as Ashok's dad
 Ek Baar Kaho (1980) as Dr. Puri (Rajni's father)
 Ek Gunah Aur Sahi (1980)
 Judaai (1980) as Mr. Dube
 Patita (1980)
 Swayamvara (1980) as Makhanlal
 Yeh Kaisa Insaaf (1980)
 Khuda Kasam (1981) as Kishanlal (Guest Appearance)
 Prem Geet (1981) as Mr. Bhardwaj
 Dulha Bikta Hai(1981)
 Dahshat (1981) as Sameer's Father
 Itni Si Baat (1981) as Darbarilal (as Madanpuri)
 Mangalsutra (1981)
 Kranti (1981) as Sher Singh
 Nakhuda (1981) as Jagannath Gupta
 Poonam (1981) as Thakur Kishan Singh
 Pyaasa Sawan (1981) as Prabhudas
 Sharada (1981) as Mr. Kohli (Anita's dad & Inder's boss)
 Haathkadi (1982) as Harimohan's Boss
 Apradhi Kaun? (1982) as Rai Bahadur Dindayal
 Badle Ki Aag (1982) as Mohanlal Verma 
 Dulha Bikta Hai (1982) as Seema's dad
 Ghazab (1982) as Jatha Shankar
 Pyaas (1982)
 Sawaal (1982) as Govindram
 Vidhaata (1982) as Khushiram Khusal Singh (K.K.)Paanchwin Manzil (1983) as Dr Radhamohan
 Agar Tum Na Hote (1983) as Shakur Ahmed
 Sweekar Kiya Maine (1983)
 Bade Dil Wala (1983) as Makhanlal
 Nastik (1983) as Police Inspector Gangaram
 Andhaa Kaanoon (1983) as Jailor Gupta
 Avtaar (1983) as Seth Jugal Kishore (Guest Appearance)
 Dharti Aakash (1983) (TV) as Jagdish
 Hero (1983) as Bharat
 Humse Na Jeeta Koi (1983) as Girdhari
 Main Awara Hoon (1983)
 Mazdoor (1983) as Daulatram 
 Naukar Biwi Ka (1983) as Movie Director
 Painter Babu (1983) at Mali Kaka
 Woh Jo Hasina (1983)
 Lorie (1984) as Mr. Kapoor (Father of 12 kids)
 Prerana (1984) as Jhumman Miya
 Baazi (1984)
 Asha Jyoti (1984) as Badri Prasad
 Mashaal (1984) as Tolaram
 Aaj Ka M.L.A. Ram Avtar (1984) as Makhanlal Kesri
 Awaaz (1984) as Mirchandani
 Khazana (1984)
 Raaj Tilak (1984) as Ranjeet
 Waqt Ki Pukar (1984) as Subedhar
 Yaadon Ki Zanjeer (1984)
 Cheekh (1985) as Thakur
 Babu (1985) as Shambhu Nath
 Jhoothi (1985) as Professor Puri
 Bepanaah (1985)
 Yudh (1985) as Dayal
 Lava (1985) as Dayal
 Jawaab (1985) as Lakhani
 Maujaan Dubai Diyaan (1985)
 Ulta Seedha (1985) as Colonel Khurana
 Yaadon Ki Kasam (1985) as Bishambharnath Kapoor
 Khel Mohabbat Ka (1986) as Rehman Khan
 Madadgaar (1987)
 Vishaal (1987) as Laawaris
 Santosh'' (1989) as Kaka

References

External links
 Watch his debut performance in Ahinsa on Gigaplex now
 

1915 births
1985 deaths
Punjabi Hindus
Punjabi people
Indian male film actors
People from Shaheed Bhagat Singh Nagar district
20th-century Indian male actors
Male actors in Punjabi cinema
Male actors in Hindi cinema